Telecon may refer to:

 Teleconference, a conversation or presentation accomplished via telecommunications
 TeleCon, a series of Trade Shows on Video Conferencing, Distance Learning, Telemedicine, Internet Streaming and other forms of Collaborative Communications Technology and Applications. The show ceased operations around 2002